Javid Shakirovich Hamzatau (born 27 December 1989) is a Russian-born Belarusian wrestler who competes in the Greco-Roman 84–85 kg division. He won bronze medals at the 2013 World Championships, 2013 Universiade, and 2016 Olympics.

References

External links
 

1989 births
Living people
People from Kizilyurt
Belarusian male sport wrestlers
European Games competitors for Belarus
Belarusian sportsmen
Wrestlers at the 2015 European Games
World Wrestling Championships medalists
Wrestlers at the 2016 Summer Olympics
Olympic bronze medalists for Belarus
Medalists at the 2016 Summer Olympics
Olympic medalists in wrestling
Olympic wrestlers of Belarus
Universiade medalists in wrestling
Universiade bronze medalists for Belarus
Medalists at the 2013 Summer Universiade